The Oscar Peterson Big 6 at Montreux is a 1975 live album featuring a jam session led by Oscar Peterson.

Track listing
 "Au Privave" (Charlie Parker)  – 11:03
 "Here's That Rainy Day" (Sonny Burke, Jimmy Van Heusen)  – 10:09
 "Poor Butterfly" (John Golden, Raymond Hubbell)  – 15:34
 "Reunion Blues"	(Milt Jackson)  – 13:29

Personnel
Recorded July 16, 1975 at the Montreux Jazz Festival, Montreux, Switzerland:

Performance
 Oscar Peterson - piano
 Milt Jackson - vibraphone
 Toots Thielemans - harmonica
 Joe Pass - guitar
 Niels-Henning Ørsted Pedersen - double bass
 Louie Bellson - drums

Production
 Norman Granz - producer
 Jamie Putnam - art direction
 Phil Stern - photography
 Gilles Margerin - design
 Phil DeLancie	 - remastering

References

1975 live albums
Oscar Peterson live albums
Albums produced by Norman Granz
Albums recorded at the Montreux Jazz Festival
Pablo Records live albums